Pi Aurigae, Latinized from π Aurigae, is the Bayer designation for a single, red-hued star in the northern constellation of Auriga. At that distance, the brightness of the star is diminished by 0.54 in magnitude from extinction caused by interstellar gas and dust.

Pi Aurigae is an evolved bright giant star with a stellar classification of M3 II. After exhausting the supply of hydrogen at its core the star has expanded to approximately 127 times the girth of the Sun.  It is classified as a slow irregular variable of type LC and its brightness varies from magnitude +4.24 to +4.34. On average, the star is radiating 6,493 times the Sun's luminosity from its enlarged photosphere at an effective temperature of 3,388 K.

References

External links
 HR 2091
 Image Pi Aurigae

M-type bright giants
Asymptotic-giant-branch stars
Slow irregular variables

Auriga (constellation)
Aurigae, Pi
BD+45 1217
Aurigae, 35
040239
028404
2091